Adio may refer to:

Business
Adio (company), the former skateboard footwear and apparel company

Music

Songs
"Adio" (song), a song by Montenegrin recording artist Knez that represented Montenegro at the Eurovision Song Contest 2015
"Adio", a 1970 song by Ljupka Dimitrovska
"Adio", a 1985 song by Ljubisa Samardzic
"Adio", song by Oliver Dragojevic

See also
Addio (disambiguation)
Audio (disambiguation)